Dausprungas (also Dovsprunk in Russian sources, died before 1238) was the older brother of Mindaugas, the first King of Lithuania. Dausprungas is mentioned in the peace treaty with Galicia–Volhynia in 1219 among the 21 early dukes of Lithuania as one of the five elder dukes, the other four being Živinbudas, Daujotas, Mindaugas and Viligaila (Daujotas' brother). Since Dausprungas is the only known brother of Mindaugas, Mindaugas' nephews Edivydas and Tautvilas are presumed to be his sons. If that is true, then Dausprungas is father-in-law of Daniel of Halych and he was also married to Vykintas' sister. Because it is known that Mindaugas used to kill his relatives to gain power and because Dausprungas is not mentioned in any other sources, some imply that he was killed by Mindaugas, but others rebut since his sons still ruled their lands in 1248.

See also
House of Mindaugas – family tree of Dausprungas
Palemonids – legendary version of Dausprungas' life

References

Year of birth unknown
13th-century deaths
13th-century Lithuanian nobility